Livesay may refer to:

 A. F. Livesay (died 1879), British architect
 Dorothy Livesay (1909–1996), Canadian poet, daughter of Florence
 Florence Randal Livesay (1874–1953), Canadian writer, mother of Dorothy, born Florence Hamilton Randal
 Michael Livesay (1936–2003), senior Royal Navy officer
 Robert Livesay (1876–1946), British Army officer, rugby international and first-class cricketer

See also 

 Livesey (disambiguation)